Reggie Doster (born January 2, 1976) is a former XFL cornerback and Arena Football League defensive back. He played for the Orlando Rage, Orlando Predators, Detroit Fury, Philadelphia Soul, Georgia Force, Grand Rapids Rampage and Utah Blaze in a career lasting from 2001 to 2008. He played college football at UCF.

High school career
While attending Deerfield Beach High School in Deerfield Beach, Florida, Doster won All-County honors in football, basketball, and track.

References

External links
Just Sports Stats
Stats from arenafan.com

1974 births
Living people
People from Deerfield Beach, Florida
American football cornerbacks
UCF Knights football players
Orlando Predators players
Detroit Fury players
Philadelphia Soul players
Georgia Force players
Grand Rapids Rampage players
Utah Blaze players
Orlando Rage players
Sportspeople from Broward County, Florida